Xurəl (also, Xürəl and Khurel’) is a village and municipality in the Qusar Rayon of Azerbaijan.  It has a population of 1,061.

References 

Populated places in Qusar District